The Dog: Happy Life is a pet simulator for the PlayStation Portable. The video game is based on The Dog and Friends franchise by Artlist.

Information
The game features realistic dogs that can be dressed up in accessories and photographed and played with in various ways. It was developed by Yuke's. The Dog: Happy Life is similar and is known to be compared to Nintendogs for the Nintendo DS. The game includes a feature that allows the player to take pictures of the virtual dog and share it on other devices like cell phones by transferring it to a PC. The game came out in April 2006 in Japan only. The format of this game is intended for a single player. The game type is considered to be a simulation, and it is strictly made for the PSP console.

References

See also
The Dog Island

2006 video games
Japan-exclusive video games
PlayStation Portable games
PlayStation Portable-only games
Video games about dogs
Video games developed in Japan
Virtual pet video games
Yuke's games

Single-player video games